Malá Čalomija is a village and municipality in the Veľký Krtíš District of the Banská Bystrica Region of southern Slovakia. Before 1919, when it was included in the newly formed nation of Czechoslovakia, the village was part of Hungary, where it was known as Kis Čalomija.

References

External links
 
 
  Statistical Office of the Slovak republic

Villages and municipalities in Veľký Krtíš District